Wenling (Wenling dialect: Ueng-ling Zy) is a coastal county-level city in the municipal region of Taizhou, in southeastern Zhejiang province, China. It borders Luqiao and Huangyan to the north, Yuhuan to the south, Yueqing to the west, looks out to the East China Sea to the east.

Jiangxia Tidal Power Station is located there as well as a number of e-waste recycling centers which have contributed to soil contamination in the region.

Because of its geographical location, Wenling has long suffered from typhoons. On August 12, 2004, Typhoon Rananim, the sixth strongest typhoon in PRC history, landed in Shitang Town, Wenling. On 10 August 2019, Typhoon Lekima, the third strongest in PRC history, came ashore at Chengnan Town, Wenling.

History
During the Xia, Shang, and Zhou dynasties, Wenling was not part of the Chinese state but rather part of the separate culture of Dong'ou. Following the third-century BC conquests of the Qin Empire, it was incorporated into the Minzhong Prefecture before being moved to Kuaiji under the Han. From the Tang to the Ming, Wenling was divided between Taizhou's Huangyan District and Wenzhou's Yueqing District.

In 1469, Taiping County was formed in the area from Fangyan, Taiping, and Fanchang, three villages formerly incorporated into Huangyan. Yueqing County's Shanmen and Yuhuan villages were ceded in 1476.
In 1513, the county seat built  of city wall, roughly squared, giving it the name of "Square Castle".
In 1914, the county was renamed Wenling to distinguish it from counties with same name in Shanxi, Sichuan, and Anhui. Wenling ("warm mountain") was once another name of Wenqiao Town.

Wenling was conquered by Communist forces on May 28, 1949, and the county government was created. In March 1994, Wenling was made a county-level "city".

Geography

Climate

Demographics
According to the 2020 Chinese census, Wenling’s resident population was 1416199, an increase of 3.6% from the 2010 census. With a population density of 1529 inhabitants per square kilometer, Wenling is the eighth-most densely populated county-level city in China. In 2021, the population with registered households in Wenling was 1216235.

Migrants account for 29.6% of the total resident population. Guizhou is the top province of origin of the migrants.

Language
Like the majority of areas in Zhejiang, most people from Wenling speak a dialect of Wu Chinese, known as Wenling Hua. It is not mutually intelligible with Mandarin Chinese, and partially intelligible with (also Wu) Shanghainese. There is also a small portion of Min Nan speakers in the southeastern regions, especially in Shitang Town. The linguistic diversity of some regions has resulted in a segment of the population becoming fluent in speaking up to three languages, when Mandarin is included.

Economy
In the 2022 CCID Top 100 Counties, Wenling ranked 16th. It has a GDP of 125.69 billion yuan in 2021, the GDP per capita is 103158 yuan (15990 US dollar). The services sector accounts for 48.7% of Wenling’s total GDP of 125.69 billion yuan in 2021. With a GDP of 55.92 billion yuan, the industrial sector contributes 44.5%. While agriculture and allied sectors share 6.8%. 

Wenling is a major manufacturing hub, the largest industrial sector is manufacturing of pumps, valves and compressors. Five out of seven publicly traded pump manufacturers in China are headquartered in Wenling. Other notable industrial sectors include shoemaking, manufacturing of bearings, gears, shafts and transmission components, manufacturing of automotive parts and accessories, manufacturing of electric machines. 

Construction is also a pillar of the city’s economy, it comprises 20% of the industrial sector.

Companies headquartered in Wenling
Zhejiang Qianjiang Motorcycle Co., Ltd.
LEO Group Co., Ltd.
Aishida Co., Ltd.
Shimge Pump Industry Co., Ltd.
Zhejiang Yueling Co., Ltd.
Fuling Global Inc.
Zhejiang Doyin Technology Co., Ltd.
Zhejiang Zomax Transmission Co., Ltd.
Zhejiang Dayuan Pumps Industry Co., Ltd
Forest Packaging Group Co., Ltd.
Wenling Zhejiang Measure & Cut Tools Trading CTR Co., Ltd.
Zhejiang Taifu Pump Co., Ltd.
Xinlei Compressor Co., Ltd.
Shuguang Holding Group
Tiansong Construction Group
Wanbangde Pharmaceutical Holding Group Co., Ltd.
Zhejiang TianShi Shipbuilding Co., Ltd.

Education
For primary and junior secondary education, the city is divided into several public school districts and is also served by a few private schools. There are 85 primary schools (including 34 school campuses and 7 private schools), 33 junior secondary schools (including 3 school campuses and 3 private schools), one nine-year school, one sports school, one art school and one special school. The enrollment number for the first grade in 2022 is 15620, the number for the seventh grade is 14408. New students enrolled in public schools are qualified by household registration and family property ownership. There are ten migrant schools for the children of migrant workers who are not eligible to enroll in public schools.

For senior secondary education, there are fourteen regular high schools and three vocational schools. The enrollment number for the first grade of high school in 2020 is 6170, and the number for the first grade of vocational school is 5095. Students are admitted on the basis of their zhongkao results.

There are 189 kindergartens, 134 of which are private.

Some students may participate in extracurricular activities. Adults can take adult education at training institutes. There are 149 training institutes, covering the training of sports, arts, English and skills training. 

There is an open university offering distance learning. Residents may use the services of the Wenling Library and its dozens of branches.

Primary and junior secondary schools
Fangcheng Elementary School
Taiping Elementary School
Wenling Experimental Elementary School
Henghu Elementary School
Sanxing Elementary School
Jinyuan Elementary School
Wenling No.3 Middle School
Wenling No.4 Middle School
Wenling High School Experimental Middle School
Wenling Experimental School
Wenling Teenagers Amateur Sports School
Wenling United Art School Affiliated to China Conservatory

Senior secondary schools
Wenling High School
Xinhe High School
Wenling No.2 High School
Ruoheng High School
Songmen High School
Daxi High School
Zeguo High School Affiliated to Zhejiang Normal University
Zhijiang High School
Wenling High School Bilingual School
Yucai School
Shusheng High School
Fanchang School
Yuying Experimental School
Cunzhi Foreign Language School

Vocational schools
Wenling Vocational Technical School
Taizhou First Technician College
Wenling Vocational Secondary School

Government
The municipal government is regulated by the local committee of the Communist Party of China, headed by the Wenling CPC Secretary. The local CPC committee issues administrative orders, manages the economy, directs the Standing Committee of the local People's Congress in policy-making and supervision of local government, and directs the Standing Committee of the local People's Consultative Conference in consultation.

Government officials include the mayor and several deputy mayors. Numerous bureaus deal with law, public security and other matters.

Administrative divisions

The county-level city of Wenling currently administers 5 subdistricts and 11 towns.
Taiping Subdistrict (Tha-bing Ka-dau)太平街道
Chengdong Subdistrict (Zhing-tung Ka-dau)城東街道
Chengxi Subdistrict (Zhing-shi Ka-dau)城西街道
Chengbei Subdistrict (Zhing-puk Ka-dau)城北街道
Hengfeng Subdistrict (Wang-fung Ka-dau)橫峰街道
Daxi Town (Da-khi Cing)大溪鎮
Zeguo Town (Dzak-kuk Cing)澤國鎮
Xinhe Town (Shing-ghou Cing)新河鎮
Ruoheng Town (Niak-wong Cing)箬橫鎮
Songmen Town (Shiung-meng Cing)松門鎮
Wenqiao Town (Ueng-giau Cing)溫嶠鎮
Wugen Town (U-keng Cing)塢根鎮
Chengnan Town (Zhing-nae Cing)城南鎮
Shiqiaotou Town (Zhik-giau-deu Cing)石橋頭鎮
Binhai Town (Ping-he Cing)濱海鎮
Shitang Town (Zhik-dong Cing)石塘鎮

Transportation

Public transportation
Taizhou Rail Transit Line S1 serves Wenling Railway Station and the western portion of the city, terminating at Chengnan.

There are 26 bus routes serving the urban area operated by 3 bus agencies and 62 bus routes serving the rural area.

Railways
Wenling Railway Station is located in Daxi and served by Ningbo-Taizhou-Wenzhou Railway and Hangzhou–Taizhou high-speed railway. In 2017, its annual ridership is about 8.5 million.

Highways and roads
G15 Shenyang–Haikou Expressway runs through the northwest of Wenling. G1523 Ningbo–Dongguan Expressway runs through the east of Wenling. Both connect Ningbo and Wenzhou.

Other arterial roads include China National Highway 104, China National Highway 228, Zhejiang Provincial Highway 225, Zhejiang Provincial Highway 226, Zhejiang Provincial Highway 324, Daxi-Shinian-Songmen First Grade Highway, Luqiao-Zeguo-Taiping First Grade Highway and Luqiao-Zeguo-Taiping Elevated Highway.

Airports
There is no airport in Wenling. Taizhou Luqiao Airport is the closest, located 26 kilometers (16 miles) to the north.
Wenling is planning to build a general airport in Dongpu Farm.

Cycling
Public bicycle service was launched in December 2011 with 3000 bikes and 300 bike racks in the urban area and selected towns. There are 10000 residents commuted by public bicycles each day in 2016. More separated bike lanes are installed in both urban and rural areas. 

Hellobike, a private bike sharing service provider, has services in the urban area.

Food 

 Qiangao (嵌糕; pinyin: Qiàngāo) is made with rice cake (Niangao) and many different dishes like fried noddle, carrots, potatoes, pork, tofu, and whatever people want. Qiangao is shaped like a big dumpling, and all the dishes are stuffed inside of it.
 Shanfenhu (山粉糊; pinyin: Shānfenhú) is made with Shanfen which is the powder made from  potato related plants. Shanfenhu is sticky and gelatinous. Different things are commonly added to it. For example, for a salty taste, pork, mushroom, beans, tofu, peanut, etc. can be added; for a sweet dish, red dates, raisins, lotus seeds, brown sugar, etc. can be added.
Paoxia (泡虾; pinyin: Pàoxiā) is a famous street snack in Wenling. It is translated as "Fried Shrimp," but it is not actual shrimp. It is fried dough made with wheat flour and stuffed with pork and cabbage.
Chuiyuan (炊圆; pinyin: Chūiyuán) is made with glutinous rice. Dried small shrimp, pork, tofu, and carrots are stuffed into the glutinous rice bun.
Maibingtong (麦饼筒; pinyin: Màibǐngtǒng) are thin crepes made from wheat flour mixed with Pseudognaphalium affine and some other green vegetable juices. Additional ingredients such as pork, stir-fried eggs, shrimp, onions, stir-fried noodles, etc. are added onto the crepes, which are then rolled up.

Media
Wenling Media Convergence Center is the only media group in Wenling. It covers newspaper, television, radio, website and mobile app.
Wenling Daily
Wenling Television
Wenling News mobile app
Wenling Radio (103.6MHz)

Notable people
Fang Ganmin (1906-1984), painter, sculptor and educator, regarded as one of the fathers of Chinese oil painting; born in Wenling
Ke Zhao (1910-2002), mathematician; born in Wenling
Li Rong (1920-2002), linguist, known for his work on Chinese dialectology; born in Wenling
Lin Xiling (1935–2009), activist and dissident, known for defending Hu Feng, lived in Wenling from the 1930s until 1953 
Zhao Yide (born 1965), politician and the current Party Secretary of Shaanxi; born in Wenling
Lü Lin (born 1969), table tennis player and gold medal winner at the 1992 Summer Olympics; born in Wenling
Guo Xiaolu (born 1973), novelist, memoirist and film-maker; born in Wenling
Tom Tong (born 1975), entrepreneur and founder of Ganqishi; born in Wenling
Joe Chen (born 1989), singer; born in Wenling
Dan Tsao (born ?), publisher, founded Metro Chinese Weekly in Philadelphia; born in Wenling
William David Rudland (1839-1912), Christian Evangelist, set up a Christian mission sub-station in Wenling

International Relations
Wenling has five friendly exchange cities.
 Logan City, Australia (since December 30, 1995)
 Seo District, Daejeon, South Korea (since December 22, 2006)
 Coclé_Province, Panama (since September 22, 2017)
 Sabinsky District, Russia (since May 18, 2018)
 Wuppertal, Germany (since December 3, 2018)

Namesake
Chinese minesweeper Wenling (817), a PLAN East Sea Fleet Type 082I mine countermeasure vessel commissioned in 2004
14147 Wenlingshuguang (1998 SG43), a main-belt asteroid discovered in 1998, named after the event of the first sunlight (“Shuguang” in Chinese) of the new millennium shining on Wenling
Wenling shark virus, a virus found in an expanded group of potential arthropod and vertebrate host species that has many similarities with Hepatitis C Viruses
Wenling crustacean virus, a group of viruses found in arthropoda and crustaceans

Accidents and incidents
13 June 2020 – Wenling tanker truck explosion disaster, a fuel truck crashed and exploded, killing 19 and injuring over 170 people in Liangshan Village, close to the city of Wenling.

References

County-level cities in Zhejiang
Taizhou, Zhejiang